Willard Francis Motley (July 14, 1909 – March 4, 1965) was an American writer. Motley published a column in the African-American oriented Chicago Defender newspaper under the pen-name Bud Billiken. He also worked as a freelance writer, and later founded and published the Hull House Magazine and worked in the Federal Writers Project. Motley's first and best known novel was Knock on Any Door, which was made into a movie of the same name (1947).

Early life and career
Motley was born and grew up in the Englewood neighborhood, South Side, Chicago, in one of the few African-American families residing there. His father was a Pullman porter. Motley graduated from Lewis-Champlain grammar school, and Englewood High School. He is related to the noted artist Archibald Motley, and the two were raised as brothers, although Archibald was in fact Willard's uncle. The family was Catholic.

Willard was hired by Robert S. Abbott to write a children's column called "Bud Says" under the pseudonym "Bud Billiken", for the Chicago Defender.

Willard traveled to New York, California and the western states, earning a living through various menial jobs, as well as by writing for the radio and newspapers. Returning to Chicago in 1939, he lived near the Maxwell Street Market, which was to figure prominently in his later writing. He became associated with Hull House, and helped found the Hull House Magazine, in which some of his fiction appeared. In 1940 he wrote for the Works Progress Administration Federal Writers Project along with Richard Wright and Nelson Algren.

In 1947, his first novel, Knock on Any Door, appeared to critical acclaim. A work of gritty naturalism, it concerns the life of Nick Romano, an Italian-American altar boy who turns to crime because of poverty and the difficulties of the immigrant experience; it is Romano who says the famous phrase: "Live fast, die young and have a good-looking corpse!" It was an immediate hit, selling 47,000 copies during its first three weeks in print. In 1949, it was made into a movie starring Humphrey Bogart. In response to critics who charged Motley with avoiding issues of race by writing about white characters, Motley said: "My race is the human race."

His second novel, We Fished All Night (1948), was not hailed as a success, and after it appeared Motley moved to Mexico to start over. His third novel, Let No Man Write My Epitaph, picks up the story of Knock on Any Door. Columbia Pictures made it into a movie in 1960. Ella Fitzgerald's music for the film was released on the album Ella Fitzgerald Sings Songs from the Soundtrack of "Let No Man Write My Epitaph".

Criticism
According to the citation statement for the Chicago Literary Hall of Fame awards, "Motley was criticized in his life for being a black man writing about white characters, a middle-class man writing about the lower class, and a closeted homosexual writing about heterosexual urges. But those more kindly disposed to his work, and there were plenty, admired his grit and heart....Chicago was more complicated than just its racial or sexual tensions, and as a writer his exploration was expansive...."  Motley was inducted into the Hall of Fame in 2014.

Death and legacy
On March 4, 1965, Motley died in Mexico City, Mexico, at the age of 55. One final novel, Let Noon Be Fair, was posthumously published in 1966. Since 1929, Chicago has held an annual Bud Billiken Parade and Picnic (which served as his pen name during his early career at the Chicago Defender) on the second Saturday of August. The parade travels through the city's Bronzeville, Grand Boulevard and Washington Park neighborhoods on the south side. The bulk of Motley's archive is held in the University Libraries, Rare Books and Special Collections, at Northern Illinois University.

Bibliography

Novels
 Knock on Any Door, D. Appleton-Century Company, 1947; Northern Illinois University Press, 1989, 
 We Fished All Night, Appleton-Century-Crofts, 1951
 Let No Man Write My Epitaph, Random House, 1958
 Let Noon Be Fair, 1966; Pan Books, 1969 – published posthumously.

Nonfiction 
 The Diaries of Willard Motley, Iowa State University Press, 1979 – published posthumously,

Letters 
 Willard F. Motley Papers, 1939–1951; Vivian G. Harsh Research Collection of Afro-American History and Literature, Chicago Public Library, 2002

References

External links 
 Encyclopedia of World Biography entry on Willard Motley.
 The Literary Encyclopedia's entry on Knock on Any Door.
 Finding aid for the Willard Motley Papers at Northern Illinois University.
 Part of his early life is retold in the radio drama "Mike Rex (Willard Motley)", a presentation from Destination Freedom

1909 births
1965 deaths
20th-century African-American writers
20th-century American male writers
20th-century American novelists
20th-century American LGBT people
20th-century pseudonymous writers
African-American male writers
African-American novelists
American male novelists
Englewood Technical Prep Academy alumni
LGBT African Americans
LGBT people from Illinois
Novelists from Illinois
Works Progress Administration workers
Writers from Chicago
African-American Catholics